Luka Begonja (born 23 May 1992) is a Croatian professional footballer who plays for NK Zadar as a midfielder.

Club career
On 14 April 2010, Begonja made his professional debut against NK Slaven Belupo where he was substituted in the 65th minute.

References

External links
 
 
 HNL-Statistika profile

1992 births
Living people
Sportspeople from Zadar
Association football midfielders
Croatian footballers
Croatia youth international footballers
Croatia under-21 international footballers
NK Zadar players
NK Lokomotiva Zagreb players
NK Sesvete players
NK Široki Brijeg players
Croatian Football League players
First Football League (Croatia) players
Premier League of Bosnia and Herzegovina players
Croatian expatriate footballers
Expatriate footballers in Bosnia and Herzegovina
Croatian expatriate sportspeople in Bosnia and Herzegovina